The Rustamji Institute of Technology (RJIT) is the first engineering college in India established by a Para Military Force. Due to deployment of the bulk of the Border Security Force (BSF) personnel in militancy affected areas, the majority of the force personnel stay separated from their families and are unable to look after the education of their children. A number of personnel are laying down their lives in the fight against anti-national elements every day.

The Rustamji Institute of Technology (RJIT) has been set up with the objective of giving an opportunity to the children of serving BSF personnel as well as for those who have laid down their lives in service to the nation, for acquiring quality based higher technical qualification. The Border Security Force education fund sponsored the development of the Institute. The Institute is named after the founding father of Border Security Force Padma Vibhushan Late K.F. Rustamji. His high ideas and visionary zeal would be a source of inspiration for the students to achieve and secure the highest goals in their careers.

The Institute campus is self-contained with all the basic facilities for all-round development of students’ personality. In addition to this, the Institute has well-equipped laboratories, a rich library with internet facility, Audio-Visual facility, and a place for organizing and conducting various other activities.

The Institute is offering various undergraduate and postgraduate courses affiliated to Rajiv Gandhi Proudyogiki Vishwavidyalaya (RGPV), Bhopal.

Purpose
The RJIT gives educational opportunities to the children of serving BSF personnel as well as for those who have laid down their lives in service to the nation, for acquiring higher technical qualifications.  The Border Security Force education fund sponsored the development of the institute.

The institute is named after the founder of the Border Security Force Padma Vibhushan Late Shri Khusro Faramurz Rustamji.

Facilities
The institute is located on the campus of BSF Academy, Tekanpur, on the Gwalior-Jhansi National Highway,   from Gwalior. The Institute has NKN facility and internet connection of 1Gbit/s, a library with internet, every classroom has an LED smart Projector and audio-visual facility, and a place for conducting activities.

The institute offers undergraduate and postgraduate courses (B.Tech, M.Tech, MCA )affiliated with Rajiv Gandhi Proudyogiki Vishwavidyalaya (RGPV) Bhopal.

Academic programmes
The programs offered by the Rustamji Institute of Technology are Bachelor of Technology (B.Tech), Post Graduate in Engineering, and Master of Computer Application. The branches in Bachelor of Engineering are Automobile Engineering, Information Technology, Electrical Engineering, Mechanical Engineering, Electronics & Communication Engineering, and Computer Science Engineering. The Post Graduate courses are (MTech) in Electronic Communication and Automobile Engineering and Master of Computer Applications (MCA).

External links

Engineering colleges in Madhya Pradesh
Buildings and structures in Gwalior district